The Wickenburg, Arizona station serves as the headquarters of the Wickenburg Chamber of Commerce, and is among the oldest of the Santa Fe's wooden stations in Arizona. It remains very nearly in its original configuration.

History 

The depot was dedicated on July 29, 1895. The station last saw passenger service in May 1969 when Santa Fe discontinued the daily Hassayampa Flyer between Phoenix and Williams Junction.

On July 29, 1995, Wickenburg celebrated the one hundred year anniversary of its railroad depot. The structure stands in its original 1895 design, without additions or modifications, and is one of the few such surviving examples of "Wild West" railroad architecture. Vice-Mayor Carol Ann Beard briefly described the history of the depot, which now serves as the Chamber of Commerce. "Estelle's Garden", in memory of a longtime Chamber supporter, was dedicated at the ceremony.

See also
 Castle Hot Springs (Arizona)
 Arizona and California Railroad
 Phoenix Subdivision (BNSF Railway)

References

External links

 Wickenburg Chamber of Commerce

Wickenburg
Transportation buildings and structures in Maricopa County, Arizona
National Register of Historic Places in Maricopa County, Arizona
Railway stations on the National Register of Historic Places in Arizona
Railway stations in the United States opened in 1895
Railway stations closed in 1969
1895 establishments in Arizona Territory
1969 disestablishments in Arizona
Former railway stations in Arizona